Peltomaa is a Finnish surname. Notable people with the surname include:

Petja Peltomaa (born 1971), Finnish screenwriter
Timo Peltomaa (born 1968), Finnish ice hockey player

Finnish-language surnames